St. Joseph's College (Autonomous) Irinjalakuda is one of the women's college in the state of Kerala, India. This institution was established in 1964 and affiliated with the University of Calicut. St.Joseph's College was the first women's college in Kerala to offer a Master's program in Mass Communication and Journalism. The institution has more than 3000+ students, 150+ highly experienced faculties, 40+ Programmes, and 35+ Value added Courses. St.Joseph's College has its own online news portal, SJC Chronicle, and campus newsletter The Commentator, which is managed and operated by its students.

On 24 January 2023, St. Joseph's College was re-accredited in the fourth cycle with A++ Level by the National Assessment and Accreditation Council (NAAC), an autonomous institution under the University Grants Commission (U.G.C.), scoring CGPA of 3.66 on 4 point scale. Currently, St. Joseph's College (Autonomous) is ranked Kerala's No. 1, and  India's No. 2, Women's College.

History
St. Joseph’s College, Irinjalakuda is a college for women, affiliated with the University of Calicut and managed by St.Joseph Educational Society of the Congregation of Holy Family. The Congregation was founded in 1914 by the visionary zeal of Saint Mariam Thresia, a pioneer in the field of the family apostolate, beatified on 9th April 2000. The founding of the college in 1964 under the able leadership of the late Mother Josephine, the Superior General, was a memorable event in the history of the Congregation.

The institution stands tall with 60 years of legacy and service solely built on the philosophy of imparting value-based education for the holistic development of women. The inspirational vision of Saint Mariam Thresia, the foundress of the Congregation of the Holy Family guides the institution to achieve its goals in higher education with the support of pioneer administrators. The insights of the revered educationist Padmabhushan, Rev. Fr. Gabriel, late Rev. Sr. Franco who was the Founder Principal, and late Rev. Mother Josephine (First Manager) helped the institution to become the first in Kerala to be accredited in 2000. 

The dedicated and constant hard work of the management helped the institution to secure an ‘A’ in the third cycle of accreditations by NAAC. The college achieved the status of Autonomy in March 2016 and the status of College with Potential for Excellence by University Grants Commission in April 2016, proving the ever-excelling efficiency of this institution in its mission of imparting quality education and women empowerment. The college is placed in the 42nd position in the National Institutional Ranking Framework (NIRF) rating of 2017 (and includes under 150 after 2017 till this year). The college is a learning platform with aspiring teachers, enthusiastic researchers, and innovative students supported by proper student management systems. The distinguished institution is the place for young women postulants to lead the College.

Notable alumni
 Justice M. R. Anitha, Judge, Kerala High Court.
 Dr. Khadija Mumtaz, Medical Practitioner, Author.
 R. Bindu, Minister for Higher Education and Social Justice in Second Vijayan ministry).
 Alice G Vaidyan, First Lady Chairman And Managing Director In The Indian Insurance Industry.
 Rekha Menon, Vice President And Head, Corporate Communications.

See also
Christ College, Irinjalakuda
Vimala College
St. Thomas College, Thrissur
University of Calicut

References

External links

Catholic universities and colleges in India
Women's universities and colleges in Kerala
Universities and colleges in Thrissur district
Irinjalakuda
Educational institutions established in 1964
1964 establishments in Kerala
Colleges affiliated with the University of Calicut